Chaksu is one of the 200 Legislative Assembly constituencies of Rajasthan state in India. It is in Jaipur district and is reserved for candidates belonging to the Scheduled Castes. It is in the Dausa (Lok Sabha constituency) and was created by Delimitation Commission in 2008.

Chaksu Constituency covers all voters from Chaksu Tehsil (excluding 4 Patwar circles of ILRC Kotkhawada - Mahadeopura, Rupaheri Kalan, Narpatpura and Rupaheri Khurd) and part of Phagi Tehsil (3 ILRCs - Chittora, Madhorajpura and Renwal).

Election results

2018

See also
List of constituencies of the Rajasthan Legislative Assembly
Jaipur district

References

Jaipur district
Assembly constituencies of Rajasthan